Heinrich Knirr (2 September 1862 – 26 May 1944) was an Austrian-born German painter, known for genre scenes and portraits, although he also did landscapes and still-lifes. He is best-known for creating the official portrait of Adolf Hitler for 1937 and is the only artist known to have painted Hitler from life.

Biography 
He was born in Pantschowa (in modern day Serbia). He studied at the Academy of Fine Arts, Vienna, with Christian Griepenkerl and Carl Wurzinger, then attended the Academy of Fine Arts, Munich, where he took lessons from Gabriel von Hackl and Ludwig Löfftz.

In 1888 he founded a private painting school in Munich, which was very popular throughout Europe. He remained in Munich and opened a private art school there in 1888. Eventually, his school gained a good reputation throughout Europe. From 1898 to 1910, he also taught at the Munich Academy. He was also a member of the Munich Secession and, later, the Vienna Secession.

At the beginning of World War I, he gave up his teaching activities and moved to Starnberg. In the 1920s, the Thannhauser family became his major patrons. After 1922, he lived in Upper Bavaria. During the Nazi régime, he remained popular and, in 1937, was represented at the first Große Deutsche Kunstausstellung at the Haus der Kunst in Munich, with one of his portraits of Adolf Hitler.

Over the next few years, he exhibited fourteen works there altogether, including portraits of Hitler's private chauffeur, Julius Schreck, and his mother Klara. Both paintings were hung in Hitler's office at the Berghof in Berchtesgaden. He also did the official portrait of Rudolf Hess, and Albert Speer often referred to him as the "court painter".

In 1942, Knirr was awarded the Goethe-Medaille für Kunst und Wissenschaft. In 1944 he died in Staudach-Egerndach.

Notable students  

 Hugo Baar 
 Erma Bossi
 Paula Deppe
 
 Otto Illies
 Eugen von Kahler
 Paul Klee
 Rudolf Levy
 Vadym Meller
 
 Ernst Morgenthaler
 Otto Nückel
 Ernst Oppler
 Emil Orlík
 Wolf Röhricht
 Milena Pavlović-Barili
 Walter Schnackenberg
 Wilhelm Scholkmann
 
 Hermann Stenner

References

External links 

German portrait painters
1862 births
1944 deaths
Members of the Vienna Secession
Academy of Fine Arts Vienna alumni
People from Pančevo
19th-century German painters
19th-century German male artists
20th-century German painters
20th-century German male artists